Elizabeth Ann Jenner (born 30 August 1941) is a British sprinter. She competed in the women's 100 metres at the 1960 Summer Olympics.

References

External links
 

1941 births
Living people
Athletes (track and field) at the 1960 Summer Olympics
British female sprinters
Olympic athletes of Great Britain
Place of birth missing (living people)
Olympic female sprinters